New Frontier is a legislative program introduced by President John F. Kennedy in the United States in the 1960s.

New Frontier may also refer to:

Entertainment

Literature
 "The New Frontier", a poem by Khalil Gibran from which President Kennedy based a famous line of his inaugural address
 Star Trek: New Frontier, set of Star Trek novels
 DC: The New Frontier, a comic book limited series

Film, television and video games
 The New Frontier (film), a 1935 film starring John Wayne
 New Frontier (film), a 1939 film also starring John Wayne
 Justice League: The New Frontier, a 2008 animated film adaptation of the DC comic book series
 New Frontier, a Sundance Film Festival venue for highlighting cinematic innovation
 "The New Frontier" (Fear the Walking Dead), a television episode
 The Walking Dead: A New Frontier, a video game

Music
 A New Frontier, a 1983 album by Borah Bergman
 The New Frontier (album), a 1993 album by Highway 101
 New Frontier (album), a 1963 album by The Kingston Trio
 "New Frontier" (song), a song from Donald Fagen's 1982 album The Nightfly
 New Frontier, a song from Counting Crows's 2002 album Hard Candy

Places
 Xinjiang, a Chinese province directly translated as "New Frontier"
 Outer space, elliptically referred to as the new frontier
 New Frontier region of United Synagogue Youth

Other uses
 New Frontiers program, an outer space program named for President Kennedy's political agenda speech
 New Frontier Party (Japan), a political party in Japan which existed from 1994 to 1997
 New Frontier Hotel and Casino, a former Las Vegas hotel and casino that closed July 16, 2007

See also
 Frontier (disambiguation)
 Final Frontier (disambiguation)
 New Frontiers (disambiguation)